Lora Bukalidi (born 1 August 1996) is a Fijian footballer who plays as a midfielder for Tailevu Naitasiri FC and the Fiji women's national team.

Bukalidi is also a field hockey player, having represented Fiji at the 2014 Summer Youth Olympics.

Notes

References

1996 births
Living people
Women's association football midfielders
Fijian women's footballers
Fiji women's international footballers
Field hockey players at the 2014 Summer Youth Olympics